Benson Masya (May 14, 1970 – September 24, 2003) was a Kenyan long-distance runner and marathon specialist, who competed in the late 1980s and 1990s. He participated at the inaugural IAAF World Half Marathon Championships in 1992 and finished in first place.

Overview
Masya was a Kamba by ethnicity.

Initially he was a boxer attached to Kenyan postal service before concentrating on running. He won the Great North Run a record four times; in 1991, 1992, 1994 and 1996. He also won the City-Pier-City Loop half marathon in the Hague twice in 1993 and 1994.

His career as a top runner came to a premature end. The Portsmouth 10 Mile race in 1996 was among his last notable achievements. His reveller lifestyle may have contributed to deteriorating performances.

Death
Masya died in September 2003, aged 33, after a period of illness. At his death, he was accompanied by his friend Cosmas Ndeti. Masya was buried in Kitui.

Achievements

References

External links

1970 births
2003 deaths
Kamba people
Kenyan male long-distance runners
Kenyan male marathon runners
World Athletics Half Marathon Championships winners
People from Kitui County
Recipients of the Association of International Marathons and Distance Races Best Marathon Runner Award